The People's Republic of China is scheduled to compete at the 2024 Summer Olympics in Paris from 26 July to 11 August 2024. It will be the nation's twelfth appearance at the Summer Olympics since its debut in 1952.

Competitors
The following is the list of number of competitors in the Games.

Athletics

Chinese track and field athletes achieved the entry standards for Paris 2024, either by passing the direct qualifying mark (or time for track and road races) or by world ranking, in the following events (a maximum of 3 athletes each):
 

 
Track and road events
Men

Women

Gymnastics

Artistic
China fielded a squad of five male gymnasts for Paris after scoring a gold-medal victory in the team all-around at the 2022 World Championships in Liverpool, Great Britain.

Men
Team

Shooting

Chinese shooters achieved quota places for the following events based on their results at the 2022 and 2023 ISSF World Championships, 2023 and 2024 Asian Championships, and 2024 ISSF World Olympic Qualification Tournament, if they obtained a minimum qualifying score (MQS) from 14 August 2022 to 9 June 2024.

Men

Women

Mixed

References

Nations at the 2024 Summer Olympics
2024
2024 in Chinese sport